Lougrea railway station opened in 1890 as the terminus of the Loughrea & Attymon branch line.  It closed on 3 November 1975.   the station building remains in a run down state but has been closed to the general public for safety precautions. The former water tower has been preserved, incorporated into the new industrial unit adjacent to the former station.

Model 

The Model Railway Society of Ireland have constructed a working OO gauge model of Loughrea railway station and surrounds.

References 

Disused railway stations in County Galway
Railway stations opened in 1890
Railway stations closed in 1975